Red Frogs Australia is a Christian Youth charity run by volunteers known as the 'Red Frogs Crew'. The volunteers participate in many events that are attended by school leavers and university students, such as schoolies week, university parties, high school seminars, music festivals and sporting events. The Red Frogs Crew gained their name from handing out lollies named Allens' Red Frogs. Since 1997, Allens' has donated over 24 tonnes of the red frog confectionery every year. The Crew's vision is to "safeguard a generation" that is outworked through education, early intervention and harm minimisation.

Origin
In 1997, founder Andy Gourley attended schoolies week on the Gold Coast with some of his friends and had an impression that a large amount of binge drinking and illicit drug use was taking place. Gourley gathered a select group of young volunteers to provide chaplaincy support for the school leavers. The sponsorship arrangement with Allen's Red Frogs gave the volunteers confectionery to use as a conversation starter, then Gourley and his friends would offer to help walk intoxicated people home. In a 2010 interview, Gourley stated that his goal "Schoolies to me ... really [is] safeguarding a generation of Australia's next leaders ... It's building a fence at the top of the cliff, rather than being an ambulance at the bottom."

Involvement in Schoolies Week
Schoolies week is the Red Frog Crew's main event of the year in which they take part. The event is well known and criticised for the amount of drinking and acts of violence that occur during the two-week period of celebrations and partying. The Crew have six main involvements in schoolies week:

"The Walkers" - Crew members who offer schoolies assistance whilst walking home from parties and celebrations
"The Talkers" - Crew members that hand out Red Frogs and promote safe partying
"Call Centre Operators" - Crew members take thousands of calls from youth in distress or who need assistance in their hotel rooms or situations they find themselves in
"The Chefs" - Crew members that cook pancakes in the early morning to provide breakfast, and also to help youths recover from the previous night of drinking
"The Cleaners" - Crew members who help clean schoolies hotel rooms/apartments from vomit and food
"The Stage Guys" - Crew members who help run the Red Frogs Stage, an entertainment centre throughout the nights

Involvement throughout the University year
The Red Frogs Crew start involvement with the university year from the Orientation Week. In an attempt to keep a good relationship with university students, the Crew members keep a stall during orientation week in which they handout approximately 60,000 University Planners, 10,000 donuts, 5,000 icy poles, and 6 tonnes of Red Frogs. The volunteers would also be found attending parties where they have 'Hydration Stations' - a stall set up to help keep university students hydrated throughout the night. The Red Frogs Crew also host many of their own events, such as coffee crawls, cooking pancakes for students at exam time, and hosting BBQ's.

Expansion 
Red Frogs have since expanded internationally into countries such as New Zealand, South Africa, United Kingdom, Canada and USA.

References

Support groups
Medical and health organisations based in Queensland
Youth organisations based in Australia